Gwendolyn Gail Graham (born August 6, 1963) and Catherine May Wood (born March 7, 1962) are American serial killers convicted of killing five elderly women in Walker, Michigan, a suburb of Grand Rapids, in 1987. They committed their crimes in the Alpine Manor nursing home, where they both worked as nurse's aides.

Crimes
The two women met at the Alpine Manor nursing home shortly after Graham had moved to Michigan from Texas. They quickly became friends, and then lovers, in 1986. Two years later they both were facing murder charges for allegedly smothering five elderly patients as part of a "love bond".

The details of the murders came almost entirely from accounts to criminal justice authorities by Wood, whose murder charges were reduced by a plea agreement so she could testify against Graham in Graham's trial for first-degree murder. However, Wood's accounts and her self-portrayal as Graham's pawn were later brought into serious question by award-winning journalist Lowell Cauffiel in his 1992 true crime book, Forever and Five Days.

According to Wood's account, in January 1987, Graham entered the room of a woman who had Alzheimer's disease and smothered her with a wash cloth as Wood acted as her lookout. The woman was too incapacitated to fight back, and thus became the pair's first victim. The woman's death appeared to be natural, so an autopsy wasn't performed. Wood claimed Graham murdered the patient to "relieve her tension." Each felt that the secret of the murder would prevent the other partner from leaving, thus cementing their bond.

Over the next few months, Graham murdered four more Alpine Manor patients, Wood alleged. Many of the victims, whose ages ranged from 65 to 97, were incapacitated and suffered from Alzheimer's disease. Wood testified that the couple turned the selection of victims into a game, first trying to choose their victims by their initials to spell M-U-R-D-E-R. But when that became difficult, they began counting each murder as a "day," as in the phrase, "I will love you for forever and a day."

A poem by Wood to Graham, and introduced in the trial, concluded, "You'll be mine forever and five days." Wood also testified that Graham took souvenirs from the victims, keeping them to relive the deaths. However, no such souvenirs were ever discovered by police. Wood also portrayed Graham as being sexually, physically and emotionally dominant in their relationship.

The couple eventually broke up when Graham began dating another female nursing aide who also worked at Alpine Manor. Graham then moved to Texas with the woman and began work in a hospital taking care of infants.

Investigation 
The murder investigation began in 1988 after Wood's ex-husband, whom she had told about the murders, went to the police. Detectives for the Walker Police Department extensively questioned Cathy Wood in a series of interviews. She incrementally leaked out her version of the homicides, portraying Graham as the mastermind and hands-on killer. The investigation led to the exhumation of two nursing home victims who had not been cremated. But when medical examination failed to reveal physical evidence of homicide, not entirely unusual in a smothering case, the county medical examiner nevertheless ruled the deaths homicides, basing it on the interviews Wood had given to the police. Warrants were issued for the arrest of Wood and Graham. On December 4–5, 1988, Graham and Wood were arrested and charged with two murders. Wood was apprehended in Walker; Graham in Tyler, Texas.

During the trial, Wood plea-bargained her way to a reduced sentence, claiming that it was Graham who planned and carried out the killings while she served as a lookout or distracted supervisors. Graham maintained her innocence, testifying that the alleged murders were part of an elaborate "mind game" by Wood. Despite the lack of physical evidence, the jury ultimately was swayed by the testimony of Graham's new girlfriend, who revealed that Graham had confessed to five killings.

On November 3, 1989, Graham was found guilty of five counts of murder and one count of conspiracy to commit murder, and the court gave her five life sentences. Graham is housed in the Women's Huron Valley Correctional Facility in Pittsfield Charter Township, Michigan.

Wood was charged with one count of second-degree murder and one count of conspiracy to commit second-degree murder. She was sentenced to 20 years on each count and has been eligible for parole since March 2, 2005. Wood was incarcerated in the minimum security Federal Correctional Institution, Tallahassee in Florida; she was released January 16, 2020 and is expected to live with relatives in South Carolina.

However, as Lowell Cauffiel documents in his nonfiction book, friends, coworkers, family members and others who knew Graham and Wood told an entirely different story than the one Wood spun as the key witness in Graham's trial. They described Wood as both a coercive and seductive pathological liar who delighted in wreaking havoc in the lives of others. Forever and Five Days presents evidence that Wood planned the first murder after she found Graham with another woman. She involved Graham as an insurance policy to keep her from ever leaving her.

When Graham left her anyway after the series of alleged killings, Wood was willing to put herself in legal jeopardy by disclosing to police to exact her revenge. The book portrays Wood as a psychopathic criminal mastermind who manipulated the prosecutor and the jury to punish Graham. Psychological testing also revealed Graham could be easily manipulated, suffered from borderline personality disorder and lacked the sophistication to plan the series of killings, let alone adequately defend herself in her trial.

Wood, the book also reveals, later told inmates two other versions of events: The first, that she had made the entire story up to put Graham away for life for leaving her for another woman. The second, that she had done all the killing, but framed Graham, also for revenge.

Several of the families sued the owners of Alpine Manor for hiring "dangerous and unbalanced employees". Alpine Manor has since gone out of business, but the building now houses a nursing home called "Sanctuary at Saint Mary's".

Media 
The case was the basis of the 1992 true crime book Forever and Five Days by Lowell Cauffiel.

Graham and Wood were featured in two episodes of the TV series The Serial Killers in which they were interviewed about their relationship and crimes. They were also featured on an episode of Snapped: Killer Couples.

The television series American Horror Story tells a highly fictionalized version of their story in its sixth season, Roanoke. The duo are depicted as sisters Miranda and Bridget Jane.

Jackie, Cathy Wood's daughter, called in to The Howard Stern Show on June 25, 2019 during the news and discussed her mother's story. "My mom is actually up for parole right now, but the victims' family members are appealing so it's taking a while for her to get out...but she's going to get out." She stayed on the air with Howard for about 10 minutes.

On September 26, 2020, an episode of Oxygen's License To Kill called "A Match Made In Hell" took an in-depth look at the case.

See also 
 List of homicides in Michigan
 List of serial killers in the United States

References

Resources 
Buhk, T.T. and Cohle, S.D. (2008). Skeletons in the closet. New York: Prometheus Books. 
Cauffiel, Lowell. Forever And Five Days: The Chilling True Story of Love, Betrayal and Serial Murder in Grand Rapids, Michigan. Pinnacle, 1997.  
"Woman Sentenced In Patients' Deaths" (Nov 3, 1989). Worcester Telegram & Gazette.

External links
 New York Times: Ex-Nursing Home Aide Gets Life Term in 5 Patient Killings
 Gwendolyn Graham and Cathy Woods by Elisabeth Wetsch
 The Serial Killers - Catherine May Wood and Gwendolyn Graham; The Lethal Lovers 
 "‘She could do it again’: Serial nursing home killer released, moves to Fort Mill" by Anthony Kustura WSOCTV, January 17, 2020.

1962 births
1987 murders in the United States
20th-century American criminals
20th-century LGBT people
American female serial killers
American serial killers
Criminal duos
Health care professionals convicted of murdering patients
Lesbians
LGBT people from Michigan
Living people
Medical serial killers
People from Grand Rapids, Michigan
Same-sex couples
Violence against women in the United States